The Institute of the Incarnate Word (IVE) is a Catholic religious institute founded in Argentina by Fr. Carlos Miguel Buela on March 25, 1984. It is a religious institute of diocesan right. The institute is the male branch of the Religious Family of the Incarnate Word, a union of religious institutes founded by Buela; the other two branches are the female religious community known as the Servants of the Lord and the Virgin of Matará (SSVM) and the Secular Third Order.

Overview 

Members of the Institute profess the vows of chastity, poverty and obedience.  In addition, a fourth vow of Marian slavery is professed following the practice of St. Louis-Marie Grignion de Montfort.

History

Foundation 

Fr. Carlos Miguel Buela founded the Institute of the Incarnate Word in Argentina on March 25, 1984, on the Solemnity of the Annunciation with the approval of Bishop León Kruk in the Diocese of San Rafael.

A few years later, in 1988, Fr. Buela founded the female branch, the Servants of the Lord and the Virgin of Matará, with the same charism and mission.  After passing almost two decades in the initial stages as a new religious community, the IVE became a religious congregation of diocesan right on May 8, 2004 under the guidance of resident diocesan Bishop Andrea Maria Erba of the Diocese of Velletri-Segni near Rome, Italy, the site of the institute's main house. At the same time the Constitutions also received official approval by a competent authority of the Church. Mons. Erba had previously received the institute's General House in the year 2000.

On March 25, 2009, the Institute celebrated its 25th anniversary. A year later saw the election of a new General Superior, Fr. Carlos Walker, IVE.

Specific locations

United States 
The first IVE priests to come to the United States arrived in New York in December 1989, the SSVM sisters arriving shortly thereafter.

Several years later, given its rapid growth, the IVE officially established the Province of the Immaculate Conception which includes the United States, Canada, Mexico, and Guyana. The Institute began its American novitiate (St. Isaac Jogues & Companion Martyrs Novitiate) in 1998, its seminary (the Ven. Fulton Sheen House of Formation) in 1999, and a high school seminary (Bl. Jose Sanchez del Rio High School Seminary) in 2008. That same year in Guyana, the IVE also started a residence for boys who aspire to the priesthood. In the province there are currently 40 priests and about 75 young men in formation.

Tajikistan 

John Paul II entrusted The Mission sui iuris in Tajikistan to the care of the Institute on September 29, 1997. As the Holy See indicates, a mission sui iuris is a special missionary territory which is not part of any diocese, vicariate, or apostolic jurisdiction.  Thus, to provide an organized structure to such a territory, the Pope appoints a religious superior as the highest-ranking Church authority within its boundaries. As of 2005 Tajikistan had only 245 Catholics being tended to by five priests, all of whom belong to the institute.

Missions 

As members of the Institute are under the auspices of the local bishops, members of the Institute may assist them in the local Churches, providing formators for the seminaries, or accepting parochial and school assignments. Thus, in addition to managing houses of formation in Argentina, Brazil, Ecuador, Peru, Italy, Taiwan, the United States, and the Philippines, the Institute provides formators and professors for diocesan seminaries and universities in Italy, Peru, the Holy Land, Papua New Guinea, Kazakhstan, Ukraine, and the United States.

 the congregation was divided into 14 Ecclesiastical Jurisdictions  of the Roman Rite and various Eastern Rites. Each jurisdiction is under the governorship of a provincial superior; the Superior General of the institute is Fr. Gustavo J. Nieto, IVE.

Religious Family of the Incarnate Word

Servants of the Lord and the Virgin of Matará 
Founded on March 19, 1988, by Fr. Buela, the Servants of the Lord and the Virgin of Matará (SSVM) is the female branch of the Religious Family of the Incarnate Word. Sharing the same founder, charisma and spirituality, they are canonically independent from the Institute of the Incarnate Word.  there were approximately 1,000 members in 35 mission areas. They have their own houses of formation and a contemplative branch.

Third Order 
The Secular Third Order or the lay order of the Family of the Incarnate Word is an association of lay faithful who live in the world while belonging to the religious family.

Contemplative Branch 

Fr. Buela founded the contemplative branch of the Institute of the Incarnate Word in December 1988. Ever since, the monks of the Institute have dedicated themselves to prayer, living in community under the same monastery roof and subjecting themselves to a rule and an abbot.

The monks live a fraternal life during times of recreation. As a sign of poverty they wear a simple monastic habit: white sackcloth, a cowl, a leather belt, and a white scapular onto which the shield of the institute is embroidered.

 the institute has six monasteries, one each in Argentina, Italy, Israel, and Tunisia, and two in Spain.

Rule 

The Institute of the Incarnate Word considers its specific end to be the evangelization of the culture, to work "through the power of the Gospel, to transform mankind's criteria of judgment, determining values, points of interest, lines of thought, sources of inspiration, and models of life" (Evangelii Nuntiandi, 19). The constitutions states that its purpose is to extend the Incarnation 'to all men, in the whole man, and in all of the manifestations of man,' all in accordance with the teachings of the Magisterium of the Catholic Church.

Fr. Buela wanted the institute to be named "of the Incarnate Word" to honor the "first and fundamental mystery of Jesus Christ," in the words of Pope John Paul II. From the mystery of the Incarnation, the member is called "to reestablish all things in Christ," (Eph 1:10).

Priestly Identity 

From the institute's Constitutions and Directories, there are 14 essential traits that must characterize a priest of the IVE. Within the institute, itself, they are known as the "non-negotiable" elements of its identity as a religious congregation. The "non-negotiables" are:
He prolongs the Incarnation of Christ
 He professes vows of chastity, poverty, obedience and Marian slavery
 He intensely practices the virtues of self-denial
 He celebrates the Holy Mass with dignity
 He practices a serious (and not a sentimental) spirituality
 He is docile to the living Magisterium of the Church of all times
 He adheres to the teaching of St. Thomas Aquinas
 He possesses a missionary and apostolic creativity
 He lives a strong community life with authentic joy
 He "sinks his teeth into reality"
 He chooses the mission no one else wants
 He practices works of mercy, above all with the handicapped, etc.
 He has a providential outlook on life
 He lives through Mary, with Mary, in Mary, and for Mary

Missionary Spirit 

The Institute places a high priority on sending missionaries to places deemed to have a greater need, either because of a lack of missionaries or because the faithful are in urgent need of them. For example, since 2014, priests and religious of the Institute of the Incarnate Word and the Servants of the Lord and the Virgin of Matara have played important roles in caring for the displaced Christian refugees fleeing the threat of ISIS attacks in Baghdad and in Syria.

The institute also has an eastern branch in accord with John Paul II's call for the Church to breathe with "two lungs," Eastern and Western.

Patroness 

Venerated as the beloved Patroness of Argentina, Our Lady of Luján is also considered the Patroness of the institute. Her image is on the walls of the rectories, convents, houses of formation, and all the other foundations common to the Religious Family.

As patroness of the missionaries of the Religious Family of the Incarnate Word, Our Lady of Luján continues to journey to foreign lands.

Apostolates 

Members of the Institute devote themselves specially to preaching. They study scripture, theology, and in the liturgy; they teach it to youth; and they preach it in the forms of popular missions (intensive pastoral missions) and the Spiritual Exercises (retreats conducted according to the method of St. Ignatius of Loyola).

The institute is also involved in works of charity with those most in need abandoned children, the disabled, the sick, and the elderly—in various houses of charity throughout the world.

Members of the Institute publish articles in journals, periodicals, essays, books, etc.

Government of the Institute 
 Until 1994: Father Carlos Miguel Buela, IVE (Founder)
 1994–2000: Father José Luis Solari, IVE (General Superior)
 1995–1998: José Antonio Rico, OSB (Pontifical Delegate)
 1998–1999: Aurelio Londoño, CM (Pontifical Delegate)
 1999–2001: Alfonso Delgado Evers, OD, Bishop of Posadas (Pontifical Delegate)
 2001–2010: Father Carlos Miguel Buela, IVE (2001.05.27 – 2010.01.22)
 2010–2015: Father Carlos Walker, IVE (2010.07.15 – 2015.12.15)
 2015–16: Angelo Todisco (Roman Rota) and Philippe Toxé, OP (Papal commissioners)
 2016: Father Gustavo Nieto, IVE (2016.07.12 – ...)

See also

References

External links 
 Ive.org - official website
 IVE America
 IVE Main Homepage-Italian
 Servants of the Lord and the Virgin of Matara USA
 GigaCatholic
 Fr. Carlos Miguel Buela

Christian organizations established in 1984
Catholic religious institutes established in the 20th century
1984 establishments in Argentina